is a Japanese footballer currently playing as a centre back for Sanfrecce Hiroshima, as a designated special player.

Career statistics

Club
.

Notes

References

2000 births
Living people
People from Ōme, Tokyo
Association football people from Tokyo
Toin University of Yokohama alumni
Japanese footballers
Association football defenders
J1 League players
Toin University of Yokohama FC players
Sanfrecce Hiroshima players